Goin' Home for Christmas is the 36th studio album by American country singer Merle Haggard backed by The Strangers, released in 1982. A Christmas album, it reached Number 41 on the Billboard Country album chart.  It was re-issued on Epic in 1984 with a completely different sleeve.  Subsequent re-issues have reverted to variations of the original sleeve, but with a bonus track, "White Christmas" added. This extra track was recorded in 1986 and released in 1988 on the various artist collection "Nashville's Greatest Christmas Hits" (Columbia CK 44412). It was co-produced by Roy Nichols, lead guitarist of The Strangers.

Critical reception

The AllMusic review states: "Merle Haggard's contribution to the holiday season is a generally festive affair... Mostly though, Haggard is an unexpectedly sensitive interpreter of these seasonal favorites."

Track listing 
All songs by Merle Haggard unless otherwise noted:

"Goin' Home for Christmas" – 2:28
"Grandma's Homemade Christmas Card" – 2:17
"Santa Claus Is Coming to Town" (J. Fred Coots, Haven Gillespie) – 2:14
"Santa Claus and Popcorn" – 2:32
"Daddy Won't Be Home Again for Christmas" – 3:23
"If We Make It Through December" – 2:39
"Bobby Wants a Puppy Dog for Christmas" – 2:09
"Rudolph the Red-Nosed Reindeer" (Johnny Marks) – 2:47
"Blue Christmas" (Billy Hayes, Jay W. Johnson)  – 2:08
"Lonely Night" (M. L. Butler, Freddy Powers) – 2:53

Personnel
Merle Haggard– vocals, guitar
Leona Williams Haggard
Jimmy Capps 
Hal Rugg 
Henry Strzelcki 
Steve Chapman
Clay Caire
Farrell Morris
Mark Casstevens
Ron Oates
Curtis Young
Donna Sheridon
Doug Clements
Louis Nunley

Chart performance

References

1982 Christmas albums
Christmas albums by American artists
Country Christmas albums
Epic Records albums
Merle Haggard albums